The Galician Academy of the Portuguese Language (Portuguese: Academia Galega da Língua Portuguesa) is a learned institution dedicated to the advancement, study, and normalization of Galicia's language. The academy promotes Reintegrationism, the concept that the language spoken in Galicia (dubbed the Galician language by some) is in fact merely a dialect of the Portuguese language and should be standardized to the international Portuguese norms of language.

Goals
The Academy's goal is to promote the study of the country's language and its integration into the Portuguese Language Orthographic Agreement of 1990. The Academy includes among its promoters some of the Galician delegates that attended the Rio de Janeiro and Lisbon meetings that led to the international treaty.

Structure
The Academy is self-governing and independent, and maintains close ties with the Brazilian Academy of Letters and the Sciences Academy of Lisbon. In 2009 the Galician Academy produced a list of over one thousand words commonly used in Galicia's Portuguese language, for introduction into various Portuguese and Brazilian dictionaries and vocabularies.

References

External links
 Academia Galega da Língua Portuguesa
 Lexicon of Galiza

Portuguese language academies
Learned societies of Spain
Galician language
Portuguese language
2008 establishments in Spain